Enriquebeltrania is a plant genus in the family Euphorbiaceae, first described in 1957. It was initially given the name Beltrania, but this turned out to be an illegitimate homonym. In other words, someone else had already applied the name to a different plant, so this one had to be renamed. The genus is native to western and southern Mexico.

Species
 Enriquebeltrania crenatifolia (Miranda) Rzed. 1979 - Campeche, Quintana Roo, Yucatán
 Enriquebeltrania disjuncta De-Nova & Sosa 2006 - Jalisco, Sinaloa

References

Adelieae
Euphorbiaceae genera
Endemic flora of Mexico